George Warren Blair (August 24, 1921 – January 1, 2020) was an American politician in the state of South Dakota. He was a member of the South Dakota House of Representatives. Blair was born in Sturgis, South Dakota and graduated from Sturgis High School in 1938. He was a United States Air Force veteran of World War II and a cattle rancher.

References

1921 births
2020 deaths
Republican Party members of the South Dakota House of Representatives
People from Sturgis, South Dakota
Military personnel from South Dakota
Ranchers from South Dakota